Edda Carin Wilhelmine Göring (2 June 1938 – 21 December 2018) was the only child of German politician, military leader, and leading member of the Nazi Party Hermann Göring, by his second marriage to the German actress Emmy Sonnemann. 

Born the year before the outbreak of the Second World War, Edda spent most of her early childhood years with her mother at the Göring family estate at Carinhall. As a child she received many historical works of art as gifts, including a painting of the Madonna and Child by Lucas Cranach the Elder.

In the final stages of the war, she and her mother moved to their mountain home at Obersalzberg, near Berchtesgaden. After the war, she went to a girls-only school, studied at the Ludwig Maximilian University of Munich, and became a law clerk. In the 1950s and 1960s many of the valuable gifts she received as a child, including the Madonna and Child painting, became the subject of long legal battles, most of which she eventually lost in 1968.

Unlike the children of other high-ranking Nazis, such as Gudrun Himmler and Albert Speer Jr., Göring did not speak in public about her father's career. However, in 1986 she was interviewed for Swedish television and spoke lovingly of both her parents.

Biography

Birth
The only child of Hermann Göring, Edda was born on 2 June 1938. Her father received approximately 628,000 messages of congratulations on his daughter's birth; tributes came in from all over the world, including telegrams from British Lords Halifax and Londonderry. The historian Giles MacDonogh later described the German reaction to the birth:

It has often been suggested that the name Edda was given in honour of the daughter of Benito Mussolini, but her mother stated that this was not so. On 4 November 1938, she was baptised at Carinhall, and Adolf Hitler became her godfather. The occasion was reported by Life, with many photographs of Edda, her parents and Hitler, who greatly enjoyed the event. Her baptism presents included two paintings by Lucas Cranach the Elder.

Early years

Edda grew up at Carinhall and like other daughters of high-ranking Nazi leaders and officials she was called Kleine Prinzessin ("Little Princess"). When she was one year old, the journalist Douglas Reed wrote in Life that she was "a sort of Nazi Crown Princess."

In 1940, the Luftwaffe paid for a small-scale replica of Frederick the Great's palace of Sanssouci to be built in an orchard at Carinhall for her to play in. Some 50 metres long, 7 metres wide, and 3½ metres high, this had within it a miniature theatre, complete with stage and curtains, and was known as Edda-Schlösschen ("Edda's little palace").

In 1940, Der Stürmer magazine printed a story alleging that Edda had been conceived by artificial insemination. A furious Göring, who already despised Streicher, demanded action by Walter Buch, the supreme Nazi Party regulator, against the editor, Julius Streicher. Buch declared he was ready to "stop that sick mind once and for all," but Hitler intervened to save Streicher and the outcome was that he was stripped of some honors, but was allowed to go on publishing Der Stürmer from his farm near Nuremberg.

1945 and after
During the closing stages of the Second World War in Europe, Göring retreated to his mountain home at Obersalzberg, near Berchtesgaden, taking Emmy and Edda with him. On 8 May 1945, Armistice in Europe Day, the German Wehrmacht surrendered unconditionally, and on 21 May, a few days before her seventh birthday, Edda was interned with her mother in the U.S.-controlled Palace Hotel, code-named Camp Ashcan at Mondorf in Luxembourg. By 1946, the two had been freed and were living at one of their own houses, Burg Veldenstein, in Neuhaus, near Nuremberg. There they were visited by the American officer John E. Dolibois, who described Edda as "a beautiful child, the image of her father. Bright and perky, polite and well-trained." During the Nuremberg trials, Edda was allowed to visit her father in prison. He was found guilty of war crimes and was sentenced to death, but on 15 October 1946, the night before his scheduled execution, Göring committed suicide by swallowing a cyanide pill.

By April 1946, Emmy and Edda Göring were living in a small house at Sackdilling.

In 1948, while living near Hersbruck with her mother and her aunt Else Sonnemann, Edda entered the St Anna-Mädchenoberrealschule ("Saint Anne's High School for Girls") at Sulzbach-Rosenberg in Bavaria where she remained until gaining her Abitur. In November 1948, the family moved to Etzelwang to be nearer the school. In 1949, Emmy faced legal problems regarding some valuable possessions and explained many of them as the property of Edda, now aged ten. After leaving school, Edda studied law at the University of Munich and became a law clerk; she later worked for a doctor. A private letter from an unknown relative in 1959 stated that "the baby is now a young lady, slim, fair-haired and pretty. She lives with her mother on the 5th floor of a modern apartment block in the Munich city centre."

Later life

In her later years, Edda worked in a hospital laboratory and was hoping to become a medical technician. She was a regular guest of Hitler's patron Winifred Wagner whose grandson, Gottfried Wagner, later recalled:

Edda worked in a rehabilitation clinic in Wiesbaden and devoted herself to taking care of her mother, remaining with her until she died on 8 June 1973. After that, for five years in the 1970s, Edda was the companion of the Stern magazine journalist Gerd Heidemann. Heidemann had bought the yacht Carin II, which had been Hermann Göring's, and according to Peter Wyden "He charmed Edda, pretty, not married, and devoted to the memory of her father, the Reichsmarschall, and started an affair with her. Together, they ran social events aboard the boat. Much of the talk was of Hitler and the Nazis, and the guests of honor were weathered eyewitnesses of the hallowed time, two generals, Karl Wolff and Wilhelm Mohnke."

For some years Edda made public appearances, attending memorials for Nazis and taking part in political events, but she later became more withdrawn. Unlike the children of other high-ranking Nazis, such as Gudrun Himmler and Albert Speer, Jr., she never commented publicly on her father's role in the Third Reich or the Holocaust. In the 1990s, she said of her father in an interview:

In 2010, Edda said of her uncle Albert Göring for an article in The Guardian, "He could certainly help people in need himself financially and with his personal influence, but, as soon as it was necessary to involve higher authority or officials, then he had to have the support of my father, which he did get."

The governments of West Germany and the reunited Germany denied Edda Göring the pension normally given to the children of government ministers of the old German Reich. As of 2015, she was reported to be still living in Munich. In that year, she unsuccessfully petitioned the Landtag of Bavaria for compensation with respect to the expropriation of her father's legacy. A committee unanimously denied her request.

She died on 21 December 2018 and was buried at an undisclosed location in the Munich Waldfriedhof.

Legal dispute over Cranach Madonna
At the time of her baptism in November 1938, Edda received several works of art as gifts, including a painting of the Madonna and Child by Lucas Cranach the Elder, a present from the City of Cologne. Part of an official collection entrusted to the office of the Oberbürgermeister (or Lord Mayor), the painting had been previously on display in the Wallraf-Richartz Museum in Cologne. The mayor at the time, had been a member of the Nazi party since 1923 and was a political ally of Hermann Göring.

After the war, the City of Cologne sought the return of the painting, on the grounds that the gifts had been unwillingly given to Edda under pressure from Göring. Advocate-General , state commissioner for racial, religious and political persecution in Bavaria, was entrusted with the return of many art treasures that had been acquired by the Görings, and the legal battle over the Cranach Madonna lasted for 15 years. At the first hearing, in the regional court of Cologne, judgment was given for the city. Edda, who at the time was studying law, appealed this decision to the Higher Regional Court of Cologne, which in 1954 overturned the lower court. Historian Anna Sigmund reports that the appeal court "came to the conclusion that [Hermann] Göring had not exerted any pressure" and "on the contrary" the mayor of the day (Schmidt) had "tried to curry favor for the city of Cologne by giving away the Cranach painting". This was Edda Göring's second legal victory of 1954. She had already been successful in forcing the state of Bavaria to return to her jewellery valued at 150,000 Deutschmarks which it had seized.

The authorities continued to pursue the case of the Cranach painting, and in January 1968 the Federal Court of Justice of Germany in Karlsruhe gave a final judgment in favour of the City of Cologne. By that point, both the state of Bavaria and the Federal Republic of Germany had laid claim to the painting, which was returned to the Wallraf-Richartz-Museum.

In popular culture
Edda Göring appears as a character in the television miniseries Nuremberg. In the 1991 comedy-drama Selling Hitler she was played by Alison Steadman.

Edda Göring is mentioned in a poem by Robert Pringle called "Stations of the Cross":

References

Sources

Printed

Online

External links
Edda Göring with her mother and Hitler, photograph at blogspot.com
Edda Göring, photograph at reibert.info

1938 births
2018 deaths
Ludwig Maximilian University of Munich alumni
Edda
Women in Nazi Germany
Burials at Munich Waldfriedhof
German Christians